The 1935 UCLA Bruins football team was an American football team that represented the University of California, Los Angeles during the 1935 college football season. In their 11th year under head coach William H. Spaulding, the Bruins compiled an 8–2 record (4–1 conference) and finished in a three-way tie for first place in the Pacific Coast Conference.

Schedule

References

UCLA
UCLA Bruins football seasons
Pac-12 Conference football champion seasons
UCLA Bruins football